Elections were held in the Niagara Region of Ontario on October 27, 2014 in conjunction with municipal elections across the province.

Niagara Regional Council

Fort Erie

Grimsby

Lincoln

Niagara Falls

Niagara-on-the-Lake

Pelham

Port Colborne

St. Catharines

The 2014 St. Catharines municipal election took place on Monday October 27, 2014 to determine a mayor, regional and city councillors and school trustees in the city of St. Catharines, Ontario. The incumbent mayor, Brian McMullan, vacated the mayoral position, declining to run for re-election.

Mayor

Niagara Regional Council (6 elected)

St. Catharines City Council
2 candidates are elected in each ward..

Ward 1 - Merriton

Ward 2 - St. Andrew's

Ward 3 - St. George's

Ward 4 - St. Patrick's

 Mark Elliott 
 Mat Siscoe

Ward 5 - Grantham

 Bill Phillips  
 Sandie Bellows

Ward 6 - Port Dalhousie

 Bruce Williamson
 Carlos Garcia

Niagara Catholic District School Board

Trustee, Ward 1

 Rhianon Burkholder (incumbent)
 Pat Vernal

Trustee, Ward 2-6 (2 Elected)

Kathy Burtnik (incumbent)

District School Board of Niagara (4 Elected)

Thorold

Wainfleet

Welland

West Lincoln

References

External links
St. Catharines Municipal Election Information Page

Municipal elections in St. Catharines
2014 Ontario municipal elections
Politics of the Regional Municipality of Niagara